Harwood Island may refer to:

 Harwood Island (British Columbia), the former name of Ahgykson, a small island off the coast of Powell River, BC
 Harwood Island (New South Wales), an island in the Clarence River